The Mucheke River is the only river in Masvingo town, Zimbabwe. It originates from the western part of the Masvingo town and merges with the Mushagashe River near Eastvale. Mucheke bridge connects the Harare-Beitbridge road with the Mutare-Beitbridge road.

Rivers of Zimbabwe
Masvingo
Geography of Masvingo Province